This is a list of nominated candidates for the Green Party of Canada in the 2019 Canadian federal election.

Newfoundland and Labrador - 7 seats

Prince Edward Island - 4 seats

Nova Scotia - 11 seats

References

External links 

 Green Party of Canada website

Green Party of Canada candidates in the 2019 Canadian federal election
Green Party of Canada candidates in Canadian Federal elections
Green Party of Canada